Robert Joseph Fisher (born September 24, 1959) is an American prelate of the Roman Catholic Church who has been serving as an auxiliary bishop for the Archdiocese of Detroit since 2016.

Biography

Early life 
Robert Fisher was born in Detroit, Michigan, on September 24, 1959, the oldest of the four children of Robert and Trudy (Torzewski) Fisher.  He attended Epiphany and St. Bede Elementary schools, both in Detroit, then went to the University of Detroit Jesuit High School.  During his summer breaks, Fisher worked at the Catholic Youth Organization (CYO) at their summer camps near Port Sanilac, Michigan.  He graduated from the University of Detroit with a Bachelor of Science degree in management science.

After finishing college, Fisher started working full time for CYO in their camping department.  By 1986, he had decided to enter the priesthood and began his studies at Sacred Heart Major Seminary in Detroit, eventually earning a Master of Divinity degree.

Priesthood 
Fisher was ordained to the priesthood for the Archdiocese of Detroit by Cardinal Adam Maida on June 27, 1992. After his ordination, Fisher was assigned as associate pastor to Our Lady Star of the Sea Parish in Grosse Pointe Woods, Michigan. In 1995, Fisher was appointed as director of priestly vocations for the archdiocese.

In 2000, Fisher was appointed as pastor of St. Angela Parish in Roseville, Michigan.  He was transferred in 2004 to serve as pastor of St. Lawrence Parish in Utica, Michigan, a post he would hold for the next 11 years.  In 2014, Fisher was appointed rector of the National Shrine of the Little Flower Basilica in Royal Oak, Michigan, a position he still holds.  Fisher also served on the Catholic Schools Council and the CYO board of directors.

Auxiliary Bishop of Detroit
Pope Francis appointed Fisher as an auxiliary bishop for the Archdiocese of Detroit and as titular bishop of Forum Pompilii on November 23, 2016. On January 25, 2017, he was installed and consecrated by Archbishop Allen Vigneron at the Cathedral of the Most Blessed Sacrament in Detroit.  Fisher chose as his episcopal motto Per Caritatem Servite Invicem, meaning "Out of love, place yourselves at one another’s service", from Galatians 5:13.

Fisher currently serves as episcopal vicar and regional moderator for the Northeast Region of the archdiocese.

See also

 Catholic Church hierarchy
 Catholic Church in the United States
 Historical list of the Catholic bishops of the United States
 List of Catholic bishops of the United States
 Lists of patriarchs, archbishops, and bishops

References

External links
Roman Catholic Archdiocese of Detroit

1959 births
Living people
Clergy from Detroit
21st-century Roman Catholic bishops in the United States
Bishops appointed by Pope Francis